

Tufts Cove Generating Station is a Canadian electrical generating station located in the Dartmouth neighbourhood of Tufts Cove in Nova Scotia's Halifax Regional Municipality.

A thermal generating station, Tufts Cove was constructed in 1965 by Nova Scotia Light and Power Company, Limited, requiring the demolition of part of this historic neighbourhood to locate the facility on the eastern shore of Halifax Harbour.  The plant replaced the Water Street Generating Station that had been opened by the Halifax Electric Tramway in 1902.

Now operated by Nova Scotia Power, a subsidiary of Emera Incorporated, the Tufts Cove Generating Station has a generating capacity of 415 megawatts.  Tufts Cove #1 was installed in 1965 with dual fuel capability to burn "Bunker C" heavy fuel oil and coal mined by the Cape Breton Development Corporation.  In 1972 Tufts Cove #1 was converted to fire only oil at the same time as Tufts Cove #2 (oil only) was commissioned.  Tufts Cove #3 (also oil only) was commissioned in 1976.  The sole reliance on fuel oil proved to be an unfortunate decision in the light of the record increase in oil prices throughout the 1970s.  The plant property occupies almost  of shoreline.  A docking facility was constructed in 1976-1977 as well as a storage tank.  The plant features three distinctive 152 m (500 ft) chimneys, one for each boiler which are tied with those at Lingan Generating Station and Trenton Generating Station as the
tallest freestanding structures in Nova Scotia. In 2000, the Tufts Cove plant was re-fitted to burn either oil or natural gas.

Emissions from the station in the form of particulates are a frequent source of pollution complaints in the neighbourhood and region, and in the 1990s, NSPI funded a $32 million project to install filters to limit the escape of pollutants.

In 2003 and 2004, two 47.3 MW simple cycle natural gas fueled combustion turbine plants were commissioned. Due to low prices in recent years, the entire plant has run largely on natural gas, which has dramatically decreased its emissions profile. A sixth generating unit, a combined-cycle generator was completed in 2011. It uses the heat exhaust of the plant's two combustion turbines and additional natural gas duct firing to generate 50 MW of electricity.

The Halifax lateral of the Maritimes and Northeast Pipeline terminates on the property.

On February 14, 2021 5 workers were sent to hospital after a fire broke out in a potash container.

Cultural reference
The stacks of the Tufts Cove Generating Station are often visible in the background of outdoor location shots in the Canadian TV comedy series Trailer Park Boys.

See also 

List of power stations in Canada
List of tallest smokestacks in Canada

References

Buildings and structures in Halifax, Nova Scotia
Natural gas-fired power stations in Nova Scotia
Oil-fired power stations in Nova Scotia
Nova Scotia Power